Erbium(III) oxide is the inorganic compound with the formula .  It is a pink paramagnetic solid.  It finds uses in various optical materials.

Structure
Erbium(III) oxide has a cubic structure resembling the bixbyite motif.  The Er3+ centers are octahedral.

Reactions 
The formation of erbium oxide is accomplished by burning erbium metal. Erbium oxide is insoluble in water and soluble in mineral acids. Er2O3 does not readily absorb moisture and carbon dioxide from the atmosphere. It can react with acids to form the corresponding erbium(III) salts. For example, with hydrochloric acid, the oxide follows the following idealized reaction leading to erbium chloride:

In practice, such simple acid-base reactions are accompanied by hydration:

Properties 
One interesting property of erbium oxides is their ability to up convert photons. Photon upconversion takes place when infrared or visible radiation, low energy light, is converted to ultraviolet or violet radiation higher energy light via multiple transfer or absorption of energy.  Erbium oxide nanoparticles also possess photoluminescence properties. Erbium oxide nanoparticles can be formed by applying ultrasound (20 kHz, 29 W·cm−2) in the presence of multiwall carbon nanotubes. The erbium oxide nanoparticles that have been successfully made by employing ultrasound are erbium carboxioxide, hexagonal and spherical geometry erbium oxide. Each ultrasonically formed erbium oxide is photoluminescence in the visible region of the electromagnetic spectrum under excitation of 379 nm in water. Hexagonal erbium oxide photoluminescence is long lived and allows higher energy transitions (4S3/2 - 4I15/2). Spherical erbium oxide does not experience 4S3/2 - 4I15/2 energy transitions.

Uses 
The applications of Er2O3 are varied due to their electrical, optical and photoluminescence properties. Nanoscale materials doped with Er3+ are of much interest because they have special particle-size-dependent optical and electrical properties.  Erbium oxide doped nanoparticle materials can be dispersed in glass or plastic for display purposes, such as display monitors. The spectroscopy of Er3+ electronic transitions in host crystals lattices of nanoparticles combined with ultrasonically formed geometries in aqueous solution of carbon nanotubes is of great interest for synthesis of photoluminescence nanoparticles in 'green' chemistry. Erbium oxide is among the most important rare earth metals used in biomedicine.  The photoluminescence property of erbium oxide nanoparticles on carbon nanotubes makes them useful in biomedical applications. For example, erbium oxide nanoparticles can be surface modified for distribution into aqueous and non-aqueous media for bioimaging.  Erbium oxides are also used as gate dielectrics in semi conductor devices since it has a high dielectric constant (10–14) and a large band gap. Erbium is sometimes used as a coloring for glasses  and erbium oxide can also be used as a burnable neutron poison for nuclear fuel.

History
Impure erbium(III) oxide was isolated by Carl Gustaf Mosander in 1843, and first obtained in pure form in 1905 by Georges Urbain and Charles James.

References 

Erbium compounds
Sesquioxides